The Prince Carl Medal is a royal medal of Sweden. The medal was instituted by Gustaf V of Sweden in 1945 on the retirement of Prince Carl, Duke of Västergötland as chairman of the Red Cross of Sweden. The medal is awarded for national or international humanitarian activity.

Recipients

The following is a partial list of recipients:
Princess Christina, member of the Swedish Royal Family and former chairman of the Red Cross of Sweden
Sture Linnér, retired diplomat and Greek cultural expert
Markku Niskala, Secretary General of the Red Cross of Sweden
Pope Pius XII
Eleanor Roosevelt, American politician, diplomat, First Lady, and activist.
Johan von Schreeb, surgeon and Associate Professor at the Center for Disaster Medicine at the Karolinska Institutet
Albert Schweitzer
Sten Swedlund, rear admiral

References

Orders, decorations, and medals of Sweden
Awards established in 1945
1945 establishments in Sweden